Gene Williams may refer to:

 Gene Williams (American football) (né Eugene Williams; born 1968), American football guard
 Gene Williams (basketball) (né Eugene James Williams; born 1947), American basketball player
 Gene Williams (musician) (né Eugene Francis Williams; 1926–1997), American jazz vocalist and bandleader from 1942 until the late 1950s

See also 
 Eugene Williams (disambiguation)